Kilcommock) is a civil parish and townland in County Longford, Ireland.

References

Civil parishes of County Longford
Townlands of County Longford
Church of Ireland parishes in the Republic of Ireland